The Flowers of the Four Seasons are a group of flowers found in Chinese and other East Asian (such as Vietnamese) art and culture which represent the four seasons, consisting of:

 (春兰) Chūnlán - Spring Orchid, 
 (夏荷) Xiahé - Summer Lotus, 
 (秋菊) Qiūjú - Autumn Chrysanthemum,
 and (冬梅) Dōngméi - Winter plum blossom. 

They contain three of the elements of the Four Gentlemen.

Gallery

See also
Flower emblems in China
Flower emblems in Vietnam
Three Friends of Winter
List of Chinese symbols, designs, and art motifs
winter flowers (Article)

References

Further reading
Flowers Of The Four Seasons: The Fundamentals Of Chinese Floral Painting, Su-Sing Chow (in English and Mandarin Chinese). Art Book Publishing Co. (1983)

Chinese culture
Chinese iconography
Chinese painting
Vietnamese culture
Vietnamese iconography
Vietnamese painting
Plants in art
Symbols